Sapan Saran is a poet, writer, and an actor based in Mumbai. She is the founding member of the theatre company, "Tamaasha", which aims to explore new theatre ideas in alternative spaces.

Career 
Her association with theatre began with a collaboration with dancer Astad Deboo. She has written the plays, Club Desire and Classics Redux, which have been directed by veteran theatre director Sunil Shanbag, with whom she also co-directed the play, Marriage-ology. Her first play- Club Desire, a Theatre Arpana and National Centre for the Performing Arts (India) production, was selected for National School of Drama's International Theatre Festival, Bharat Rang Mahotsav 2015. "The Churchgate Couple", a short 10-minute piece from Marriage-ology, written by her, garnered appreciation by critics and audiences alike. 
She performs plays regularly, and has modelled in several advertisements and acted in films. Her poems have been published in several magazines, including  Sahitya Akademi's Samkaaleen Bhaarteeya Sahitya. Her first book of poems is due for publication.

Filmography 

Her film-work includes Sun TV's Kanden Kadhalai and Gautham Vasudev Menon's Telugu film Ye Maaya Chesave, with Naga Chaitanya. The film's music is by A.R. Rahman.

References

External links 

Actresses in Tamil cinema
Actresses in Telugu cinema
Actresses from Mumbai
Living people
Actresses in Hindi cinema
Indian film actresses
21st-century Indian actresses
Year of birth missing (living people)